Whitecraigs Rugby Football Club is a rugby union club based in Newton Mearns, East Renfrewshire, Scotland. The team competes in Scottish National League Division Two, the third tier of Scottish club rugby.

Whitecraigs formerly played its rugby in Deaconsbank

Honours

 Dumbarton Sevens
 Champions: (2) 1985, 1995

Notable players

These players played at a professional level.

  Jon Welsh - Glasgow Warriors, Newcastle Falcons and Scotland
  Ed Kalman - Border Reivers, Glasgow Warriors and Scotland
  Steve Swindall - Glasgow Warriors, Rotherham Titans and Scotland 'A'
  John Shaw - Glasgow Warriors and Scotland A
  Ryan Moffat - Glasgow Warriors

These players are now coaches:

  Kenny Murray - Glasgow Warriors Asst. Coach

References

External links
 Whitecraigs RFC

1928 establishments in Scotland
Rugby union in East Renfrewshire
Scottish rugby union teams
Newton Mearns
Rugby clubs established in 1928